Bright Prospects (Swedish:Den ljusnande framtid) is a 1941 Swedish drama film directed by Gustaf Molander and starring Signe Hasso, Ernst Eklund and Erik 'Bullen' Berglund.

The film's art direction was by Arne Åkermark.

Cast
 Signe Hasso as Birgit Norén  
 Ernst Eklund as Helge Dahlberg  
 Erik 'Bullen' Berglund as Gurkan Olsson  
 Eric Abrahamsson as Norrman 
 Alf Kjellin as Åke Dahlberg  
 Rose-Mari Molander as Inga  
 Eva Henning as Gun Ullman  
 George Fant as Tage Lovander  
 Karin Alexandersson as Maria 
 Gull Natorp as Mrs. Norrman  
 Ejnar Haglund as Edlund  
 Carl Ström as Police Inspector Borgström  
 Willy Peters as Borg 
 John Botvid as Jansson  
 Carl Deurell as Teacher  
 Britta Larsson as Kerstin Linder  
 John Norrman as Strömberg - The Porter  
 Stig Olin as Bertil Bergström  
 Hans Strååt as Student  
 Sol-Britt Agerup as Schoolgirl  
 Astrid Bodin as Emma - Olsson's Maid  
 Elly Christiansson as Lady at Dinner  
 Iris Dalunde as Schoolgirl  
 Tom Ekelund as Sven  
 Hortensia Hedström as Teacher's Wife  
 Karin Nordgren as Schoolgirl  
 Nina Scenna as Waitress  
 Victor Thorén as School Caretaker  
 Eric von Gegerfelt as Guest at Dinner  
 Susanna Östberg as Dancing Girl

References

Bibliography 
 Mariah Larsson & Anders Marklund. Swedish Film: An Introduction and Reader. Nordic Academic Press, 2010.

External links 
 

1941 films
1941 drama films
Swedish drama films
1940s Swedish-language films
Films directed by Gustaf Molander
Swedish black-and-white films
1940s Swedish films